Hightown is a village in the New Forest district of Hampshire, England. Its nearest town is Ringwood, which lies approximately 0.8 miles (1.3 km) north-west from the village.

It straddles the border of the New Forest National Park. The village has one inn called The Elm Tree. The inn is the monthly meeting place of the Wessex Hang Gliding and Paragliding Club.

To the east of the village is Hightown Common. It was passed to the National Trust, together with a memorial seat, designed by architect Elisabeth Scott.

References

External links

Villages in Hampshire
New Forest
Ringwood, Hampshire